Gladwin Hill (June 16, 1914, Boston – September 19, 1992, Los Angeles) was an American journalist who was a member of the famed Writing 69th, a group of reporters who trained and flew on bombing missions with the Eighth Air Force.

Education
Hill was an alumnus of Harvard University.

The Writing 69th
As a member of the group of reporters who were alternatively known as either the Writing 69th, the Legion of the Doomed or the Flying Typewriters, Hill trained with the United States Eighth Air Force. The training covered important topics such as high altitude adjustment, weapons and parachuting. Hill worked for the Associated Press from 1936–1944 and was the AP correspondent assigned to the bomber missions. Hill flew his first and last mission on Feb. 26, 1943. On that day one of the planes carrying a reporter, Robert Post, was shot down and Post and eight Air Force personnel were killed. He described the mission in his article the next day, "It was thrilling. Yet at the same time it was strangely prosaic in the business-like efficiency with which it was executed."

After the war
After World War II ended, Hill went to work for the New York Times in their Los Angeles bureau. Hill worked there from 1946 to 1968.

On Nov. 22, 1963, Hill was dispatched by the Times to Dallas to cover the assassination of President John F. Kennedy. He voluntarily offered the FBI an interview about what he knew in relation to Jack Ruby shooting Lee Harvey Oswald. The interview basically determined when Hill heard the shot and "immediately realizing what was happening he ran out of the police building through another exit to take up a position by the van."

Hill also wrote books on environmental issues and politics.

Nuclear testing
Hill observed several nuclear tests conducted at the Nevada Test Site. On 1 November 1951, unable to get official clearance to attend the Operation Buster-Jangle Dog nuclear test, Hill was on Mount Charleston, a large mountain northwest of Las Vegas, in order to view the explosion which occurred about 60 miles to the north. After the explosion, Hill and the other assembled newsmen realized the highly radioactive mushroom cloud was moving in their direction at high speed. Hill decided to leave the mountain and began driving down the twisting mountain road, but was unable to clear the area before the cloud arrived. He realised that the cloud was directly over him, writing later about it "emphasizing its presence with a blast of static on my car radio." He stopped and stepped out of the car to observe the cloud's passing. Later, in Indian Springs, an acquaintance with a Geiger counter measured more than 20 milliroentgens per hour on some parts of his car.

Death
Hill died from lung cancer in 1992 at the age of 78.

Books
Dancing Bear: An Inside Look at California Politics: (1968)
The Politics of Air Pollution: Public Interest and Pressure Groups: 1968
Madman In a Lifeboat: Issues of the Environmental Crisis: (1973)

External links
Oswald charged in police killing: By: Gladwin Hill, The New York Times, Nov. 22, 1963
Evidence Against Oswald Described as Conclusive: By: Gladwin Hill, The New York Times, Nov. 23, 1963
President's Assassin Shot to Death: By: Gladwin Hill, The New York Times, Nov. 24, 1963
When the Bill for the Marvels Falls Due:By Gladwin Hill, The New York Times, Sep. 20, 1986

Notes

1914 births
Harvard University alumni
American male journalists
American reporters and correspondents
1992 deaths
20th-century American non-fiction writers
20th-century American male writers
American war correspondents of World War II